The 1974 World Football League season was the first season of the World Football League.

Twelve teams began the inaugural 1974 season, which launched July 10 and lasted 19 weeks with no bye week. The league doubled up the week of Labor Day by playing four games over the course of three weeks on a Wednesday, Monday (Labor Day), Friday, Wednesday schedule, giving the WFL teams 20 games each. Two teams, the Detroit Wheels and Jacksonville Sharks dropped out and folded after fourteen weeks, with the New York Stars and Houston Texans relocating to other markets (Charlotte and Shreveport respectively) during the season. Portland and Detroit played a week 9 regular season game in London, Ontario at Little Stadium.
 
The season culminated in World Bowl 1 on December 5, 1974, won by the Birmingham Americans.

1974 season

Final standings

W = Wins, L = Losses, T = Ties, PCT= Winning Percentage, PF = Points For, PA = Points Against

Notes: 
(a) Jacksonville and Detroit folded after 14 games; each week thereafter, the teams that had games scheduled against those teams played each other. 
(b) Shreveport Steamer began the season as Houston Texans.
(c) Charlotte Hornets began season as New York Stars; upon announcing move to Charlotte, played one away game as Charlotte Stars, and remaining games as Hornets. 
(d) Chicago forfeited its 20th game to Philadelphia, 2–0.

Source:

1974 Playoffs

The original WFL schedule had the three division champions plus one wild-card qualify, culminating in a "World Bowl" on the evening after Thanksgiving at the Gator Bowl in Jacksonville.

With financial problems mounting, various formats were bandied about: 
 The playoffs would be scratched and the team with the best record would be declared  champion.
 Three teams (Memphis, Birmingham, and Florida) would qualify for the playoff, with West champ Southern California left out.
The best eight of the remaining 10 teams would qualify.
 The top two teams in each division would qualify, seeded entirely by won-lost record.

Eventually, the playoffs were set with the opening rounds consisting of two teams from each division, with the two qualifying teams from the Central Division (Memphis and Birmingham), who ranked first and second in overall record, given byes to the next round. The Hawaiians faced Southern California in the West, but in the East, Florida instead faced Philadelphia, even though, at 9–11, the Bell were 1 game behind 10–10 Charlotte in the standings. However, when only 1,000 advance tickets were sold for the Blazers-Hornets matchup, league officials replaced the Hornets with the Bell. The Hornets were still reeling from their New York debts, and it was believed that the advance gate would not be nearly enough to justify the trip (reportedly, the players would have been lucky to get $100 for the game). The Bell, on the other hand, were on far stronger financial ground, and it was believed they could cover their own expenses.

Quarterfinals

Hawaiians defeated the Southern California Sun, 32–14 (@ Anaheim, California on Wednesday, November 20, 1974)

Florida Blazers defeated Philadelphia Bell, 18–3 (@ Orlando, Florida on Thursday, November 21, 1974)

Semifinals

Birmingham Americans defeated The Hawaiians, 22–19 (@ Birmingham, Alabama on Wednesday, November 27, 1974)

Florida Blazers defeated Memphis Southmen, 18–15 (@ Memphis, Tennessee on Friday, November 29, 1974)

World Bowl

Birmingham Americans 22, Florida Blazers 21 (@ Birmingham, Alabama on Thursday, December 5, 1974)

1974 All-WFL Team

Offense
WR–Tim Delaney, Hawaiians (TSN, P&C)
WR–Alfred Jenkins, Birmingham Americans (TSN, P&C)
TE–Ed Marshall,  Memphis Southmen (TSN)
TE–Greg Latta, Florida Blazers (P&C)
OT–Bob Wolfe, Birmingham Americans (TSN)
OT–Wally Highsmith, Memphis Southmen (P&C)
OT–Ron Mikolajczyk, Memphis Southmen (P&C)
OG–Rick Anthony, Florida Blazers P&C (P&C)
OG–Dave Bradley, Chicago Fire (TSN)
OG–Buddy Brown, Birmingham Americans (TSN, P&C)
C–Bob Kuziel, New York Stars/Charlotte Hornets (TSN)
C–Ralph Hill, Memphis Southmen (P&C)
QB–Tony Adams, Southern California Sun (TSN)
QB–Randy Johnson, Hawaiians (P&C)
RB–Tommy Reamon, Florida Blazers (TSN, P&C)
RB–J.J. Jennings, Memphis Southmen (TSN, P&C)
K–Grant Guthrie, Jacksonville Sharks/Birmingham Americans (TSN, P&C)

Defense
DE–Gerry Philbin, New York Stars/Charlotte Hornets (TSN, P&C)
DE–Louis Ross, Florida Blazers (TSN)
DE–John Ricca, Florida Blazers (P&C)
DT–Mike McBath, Florida Blazers (TSN, P&C)
DT–John Elliott, New York Stars/Charlotte Hornets (TSN)
DT–Dave Roller,  Southern California Sun (TSN, P&C)
LB–Ross Brupbacher, Birmingham Americans (TSN, P&C)
LB–Rudy Kuechenberg,  Chicago Fire (TSN, P&C)
LB–John Villapiano, Houston Texans/Shreveport (TSN, P&C)
CB–Miller Farr,  Florida Blazers (TSN, P&C)
CB–Ron Mabra,  Philadelphia  Bell (TSN, P&C)
S–Dave Thomas, Memphis Southmen (TSN, P&C)
S–Jeff Woodcock, New York Stars/Charlotte Hornets (TSN, P&C)
P–Ken Clark, Portland Storm (TSN, P&C)

Head Coach: Jack Pardee, Florida Blazers (TSN, P&C)
Tri-MVPs: Tony Adams, Southern California, J.J. Jennings, Memphis, and Tommy Reamon, Florida.
Key: PC = voted on by players and coaches of the WFL; TSN = selection by The Sporting News

See also

 1975 World Football League season

References 

World Football League
World Football League